The 2010–11 Golden State Warriors season was the 65th season of the franchise in the National Basketball Association (NBA) and its 49th in the San Francisco Bay Area.

Draft

Roster

Pre-season

|- bgcolor="#ccffcc"
| 1
| October 8
| L.A. Clippers
| 
| Monta Ellis (22)
| Andris Biedriņš (10)
| Stephen Curry (6)
| Oracle Arena10,004
| 1–0
|- bgcolor="#ccffcc"
| 2
| October 10
| Sacramento
| 
| Monta Ellis (18)
| Jeff Adrien (15)
| Monta Ellis (6)
| Oracle Arena10,537
| 2–0
|- bgcolor="#ffcccc"
| 3
| October 12
| @ Sacramento
| 
| Monta Ellis (18)
| David Lee (10)
| Monta Ellis (4)
| ARCO Arena10,786
| 2–1
|- bgcolor="#ffcccc"
| 4
| October 16
| @ Portland
| 
| Curry, Lee (17)
| David Lee (11)
| Stephen Curry (11)
| Rose Garden19,727
| 2–2
|- bgcolor="#ccffcc"
| 5
| October 18
| Portland
| 
| Monta Ellis (22)
| David Lee (12)
| Stephen Curry (6)
| Oracle Arena11,246
| 3–2
|- bgcolor="#ffcccc"
| 6
| October 19
| @ Phoenix
| 
| Monta Ellis (29)
| Lee, Biedriņš (9)
| Monta Ellis (5)
| US Airways Center14,635
| 3–3
|- bgcolor="#ffcccc"
| 7
| October 21
| @ L.A. Lakers
| 
| Stephen Curry (19)
| Andris Biedriņš (13)
| Dorell Wright (6)
| San Diego Sports Arena11,150
| 3–4
|- bgcolor="#ffcccc"
| 8
| October 22
| @ L.A. Lakers
| 
| Monta Ellis (41)
| David Lee (14)
| Reggie Williams (8)
| Citizens Business Bank Arena10,556
| 3–5
|-

Regular season

Standings

Record vs. opponents

* – Division leader 
x – Clinched playoffs 
y – Division leader

Game log

|- bgcolor="#ccffcc"
| 1
| October 27
| Houston
| 
| Monta Ellis (46)
| David Lee (15)
| Stephen Curry (11)
| Oracle Arena18,428
| 1–0
|- bgcolor="#ccffcc"
| 2
| October 29    
| L.A. Clippers
| 
| Dorell Wright (24)
| David Lee (12)
| Stephen Curry (11)
| Oracle Arena17,408
| 2–0
|- bgcolor="#ffcccc"
| 3
| October 31
| @ L.A. Lakers
| 
| Monta Ellis (20)
| Biedriņš, Carney (8)
| Biedriņš, Williams (4)
| Staples Center18,997
| 2–1
|-

|- bgcolor="#ccffcc"
| 4
| November 3
| Memphis
| 
| Monta Ellis (39)
| David Lee (16)
| Ellis, Williams (8)
| Oracle Arena16,607
| 3–1
|- bgcolor="#ccffcc"
| 5
| November 5
| Utah
| 
| Monta Ellis (23)
| Andris Biedriņš (20)
| Stephen Curry (6)
| Oracle Arena17,902
| 4–1
|- bgcolor="#ffcccc"
| 6
| November 7
| @ Detroit
| 
| Monta Ellis (24)
| Andris Biedriņš (13)
| Stephen Curry (6)
| The Palace of Auburn Hills12,813
| 4–2
|- bgcolor="#ccffcc"
| 7
| November 8
| @ Toronto
| 
| Stephen Curry (34)
| David Lee (12)
| Stephen Curry (4)
| Air Canada Centre14,127
| 5–2
|- bgcolor="#ccffcc"
| 8
| November 10
| @ New York
| 
| David Lee (28)
| David Lee (10)
| Stephen Curry (8)
| Madison Square Garden19,763
| 6–2
|- bgcolor="#ffcccc"
| 9
| November 11
| @ Chicago
| 
| Monta Ellis (24)
| Dorell Wright (8)
| Stephen Curry (6)
| United Center21,140
| 6–3
|- bgcolor="#ffcccc"
| 10
| November 13
| @ Milwaukee
| 
| Monta Ellis (24)
| Andris Biedriņš (9)
| Monta Ellis (8)
| Bradley Center17,049
| 6–4
|- bgcolor="#ccffcc"
| 11
| November 15
| Detroit
| 
| Monta Ellis (27)
| Dan Gadzuric (11)
| Dorell Wright (6)
| Oracle Arena19,123
| 7–4
|- bgcolor="#ffcccc"
| 12
| November 19
| New York
| 
| Monta Ellis (40)
| Andris Biedriņš (8)
| Stephen Curry (8)
| Oracle Arena19,808
| 7–5
|- bgcolor="#ffcccc"
| 13
| November 21
| @ L.A. Lakers
| 
| Dorell Wright (16)
| Jeff Adrien (10)
| Bell, Ellis (3)
| Staples Center18,997
| 7–6
|- bgcolor="#ffcccc"
| 14
| November 22
| Denver
| 
| Monta Ellis (20)
| Dan Gadzuric (11)
| Stephen Curry (5)
| Oracle Arena18,023
| 7–7
|- bgcolor="#ffcccc"
| 15
| November 24
| @ Houston
| 
| Dorell Wright (24)
| Andris Biedriņš (10)
| Stephen Curry (6)
| Toyota Center13,847
| 7–8
|- bgcolor="#ffcccc"
| 16
| November 26
| @ Memphis
| 
| Andris Biedriņš (28)
| Andris Biedriņš (21)
| Ellis, Wright (8)
| FedExForum14,753
| 7–9
|- bgcolor="#ccffcc"
| 17
| November 27
| @ Minnesota
| 
| Dorell Wright (30)
| Andris Biedriņš (12)
| Monta Ellis (10)
| Target Center14,440
| 8–9
|- bgcolor="#ffcccc"
| 18
| November 30
| San Antonio
| 
| Stephen Curry (32)
| Andris Biedriņš (18)
| Curry, Lee (5)
| Oracle Arena17,877
| 8–10
|-

|- bgcolor="#ffcccc"
| 19
| December 2
| Phoenix
| 
| Monta Ellis (38)
| Dorell Wright (10)
| 3 players tied (7)
| Oracle Arena18,328
| 8–11
|- bgcolor="#ffcccc"
| 20
| December 5
| @ Oklahoma City
| 
| Stephen Curry (39)
| Dorell Wright (11)
| Stephen Curry (6)
| Oklahoma City Arena18,203
| 8–12
|- bgcolor="#ffcccc"
| 21
| December 7
| @ Dallas
| 
| Stephen Curry (21)
| Biedriņš, Wright (11)
| Ellis, Lee (7)
| American Airlines Center19,593
| 8–13
|- bgcolor="#ffcccc"
| 22
| December 8
| @ San Antonio
| 
| Reggie Williams (31)
| David Lee (13)
| Ellis, Lee (6)
| AT&T Center16,913
| 8–14
|- bgcolor="#ffcccc"
| 23
| December 10
| Miami
| 
| Monta Ellis (20)
| Dorell Wright (10)
| Monta Ellis (7)
| Oracle Arena20,036
| 8–15
|- bgcolor="#ffcccc"
| 24
| December 13
| @ Utah
| 
| Dorell Wright (20)
| Biedriņš, Lee (12)
| Reggie Williams  (6)
| EnergySolutions Arena19,176
| 8–16
|- bgcolor="#ccffcc"
| 25
| December 14
| Minnesota
| 
| Monta Ellis (34)
| Andris Biedriņš (12)
| Monta Ellis (6)
| Oracle Arena17,615
| 9–16
|- bgcolor="#ffcccc"
| 26
| December 18
| @ Portland
| 
| Monta Ellis (26)
| David Lee (11)
| Monta Ellis (5)
| Rose Garden20,398
| 9–17
|- bgcolor="#ffcccc"
| 27
| December 20
| Houston
| 
| Monta Ellis (44)
| Amundson, Udoh (7)
| Monta Ellis (7)
| Oracle Arena19,256
| 9–18
|- bgcolor="#ccffcc"
| 28
| December 21
| @ Sacramento
| 
| Monta Ellis (36)
| David Lee (12)
| Monta Ellis (7)
| ARCO Arena13,740
| 10–18
|- bgcolor="#ccffcc"
| 29
| December 25
| Portland
| 
| Monta Ellis (39)
| Dorell Wright (8)
| Stephen Curry (11)
| Oracle Arena19,596
| 11–18
|- bgcolor="#ccffcc"
| 30
| December 27
| Philadelphia
| 
| Dorell Wright (28)
| David Lee (16)
| Monta Ellis (12)
| Oracle Arena19,208
| 12-18
|- bgcolor="#ffcccc"
| 31
| December 29
| @ Atlanta
| 
| Dorell Wright (32)
| Dorell Wright (11)
| Stephen Curry (12)
| Philips Arena15,925
| 12–19
|- bgcolor="#ccffcc"
| 32
| December 31
| @ Charlotte
| 
| Monta Ellis (25)
| Amundson, Lee (8)
| Monta Ellis (5)
| Time Warner Cable Arena16,249
| 13–19
|-

|- bgcolor="#ffcccc"
| 33
| January 1
| @ Miami
| 
| Dorell Wright (30)
| David Lee (12)
| Monta Ellis (7)
| American Airlines Arena20,254
| 13–20
|- bgcolor="#ffcccc"
| 34
| January 3
| @ Orlando
| 
| Monta Ellis (20)
| Monta Ellis (7)
| Stephen Curry (5)
| Amway Center18,846
| 13–21
|- bgcolor="#ccffcc"
| 35
| January 5
| @ New Orleans
| 
| Monta Ellis (29)
| Louis Amundson (12)
| Curry, Ellis (4)
| New Orleans Arena13,532
| 14–21
|- bgcolor="#ccffcc"
| 36
| January 7
| Cleveland
| 
| Monta Ellis (32)
| David Lee (14)
| Monta Ellis (10)
| Oracle Arena18,858
| 15–21
|- bgcolor="#ffcccc"
| 37
| January 9
| @ L.A. Clippers
| 
| Dorell Wright (27)
| Dan Gadzuric (7)
| Monta Ellis (6)
| Staples Center17,696
| 15–22
|- bgcolor="#ffcccc"
| 38
| January 12
| L.A. Lakers
| 
| Monta Ellis (38)
| Lee, Wright (7)
| Stephen Curry (10)
| Oracle Arena19,596
| 15–23
|- bgcolor="#ccffcc"
| 39
| January 14
| L.A. Clippers
| 
| Monta Ellis (30)
| David Lee (9)
| Ellis, Lee (6)
| Oracle Arena19,273
| 16–23
|- bgcolor="#ccffcc"
| 40
| January 17
| New Jersey
| 
| Monta Ellis (26)
| David Lee (10)
| Monta Ellis (9)
| Oracle Arena18,563
| 17–23
|- bgcolor="#ccffcc"
| 41
| January 19
| Indiana
| 
| Monta Ellis (36)
| David Lee (9)
| Stephen Curry (7)
| Oracle Arena18,185
| 18–23
|- bgcolor="#ccffcc"
| 42
| January 21
| Sacramento
| 
| Stephen Curry (34)
| Dorell Wright (12)
| Monta Ellis (9)
| Oracle Arena18,428
| 19–23
|- bgcolor="#ffcccc"
| 43
| January 22
| @ L.A. Clippers
| 
| Stephen Curry (32)
| David Lee (15)
| Stephen Curry (8)
| Staples Center19,373
| 19–24
|- bgcolor="#ffcccc"
| 44
| January 24
| San Antonio
| 
| David Lee (31)
| David Lee (12)
| Dorell Wright (9)
| Oracle Arena18,523
| 19–25
|- bgcolor="#ffcccc"
| 45
| January 26
| New Orleans
| 
| Monta Ellis (26)
| David Lee (10)
| Stephen Curry (6)
| Oracle Arena18,108
| 19–26
|- bgcolor="#ffcccc"
| 46
| January 28
| Charlotte
| 
| Stephen Curry (27)
| Andris Biedriņš (12)
| Ellis, Wright (6)
| Oracle Arena18,407
| 19–27
|- bgcolor="#ccffcc"
| 47
| January 30
| Utah
| 
| Stephen Curry (27)
| Louis Amundson (11)
| Stephen Curry (7)
| Oracle Arena18,187
| 20–27
|-

|- bgcolor="#ccffcc"
| 48
| February 3
| Milwaukee
| 
| Monta Ellis (24)
| Andris Biedriņš (10)
| Ellis, Wright (6)
| Oracle Arena18,008
| 21–27
|- bgcolor="#ccffcc"
| 49
| February 5
| Chicago
| 
| Monta Ellis (33)
| Andris Biedriņš (8)
| Stephen Curry (8)
| Oracle Arena19,596
| 22–27
|- bgcolor="#ffcccc"
| 50
| February 7
| Phoenix
| 
| Monta Ellis (21)
| Monta Ellis (12)
| Stephen Curry (8)
| Oracle Arena18,002
| 22–28
|- bgcolor="#ccffcc"
| 51
| February 9
| Denver
| 
| Monta Ellis (37)
| Biedriņš, Lee (12)
| Dorell Wright (8)
| Oracle Arena18,430
| 23–28
|- bgcolor="#ffcccc"
| 52
| February 10
| @ Phoenix
| 
| Williams, Udoh (16)
| Ekpe Udoh (7)
| Reggie Williams (6)
| US Airways Center16,731
| 23–29
|- bgcolor="#ccffcc"
| 53
| February 13
| Oklahoma City
| 
| Monta Ellis (33)
| David Lee (19)
| Stephen Curry (13)
| Oracle Arena19,596
| 24–29
|- bgcolor="#ccffcc"
| 54
| February 15
| New Orleans
| 
| Monta Ellis (21)
| Ekpe Udoh (7)
| Stephen Curry (8)
| Oracle Arena18,276
| 25–29
|- bgcolor="#ccffcc"
| 55
| February 16
| @ Utah
| 
| Monta Ellis (35)
| Andris Biedriņš (9)
| Monta Ellis (7)
| EnergySolutions Arena19,911
| 26–29
|- align="center"
|colspan="9" bgcolor="#bbcaff"|All-Star Break
|- bgcolor="#ffcccc"
| 56
| February 22
| Boston
| 
| Dorell Wright (19)
| Udoh, Wright (6)
| Acie Law (5)
| Oracle Arena19,738
| 26–30
|- bgcolor="#ffcccc"
| 57
| February 25
| Atlanta
| 
| David Lee (20)
| David Lee (10)
| Curry, Ellis (5)
| Oracle Arena19,858
| 26–31
|- bgcolor="#ffcccc"
| 58
| February 27
| @ Minnesota
| 
| Stephen Curry (33)
| Stephen Curry (11)
| Monta Ellis (8)
| Target Center16,021
| 26–32
|-

|- bgcolor="#ffcccc"
| 59
| March 1
| @ Indiana
| 
| Reggie Williams (25)
| David Lee (11)
| Stephen Curry (7)
| Conseco Fieldhouse9,557
| 26–33
|- bgcolor="ccffcc"
| 60
| March 2
| @ Washington
| 
| Stephen Curry (29)
| David Lee (16)
| David Lee (6)
| Verizon Center17,865
| 27–33
|- bgcolor="#ffcccc"
| 61
| March 4
| @ Boston
| 
| Monta Ellis (41)
| David Lee (12)
| Stephen Curry (5)
| TD Garden18,624
| 27–34
|- bgcolor="#ffcccc"
| 62
| March 6
| @ Philadelphia
| 
| Monta Ellis (27)
| David Lee (14)
| Stephen Curry (7)
| Wells Fargo Center11,294
| 27–35
|- bgcolor="#ccffcc"
| 63
| March 8
| @ Cleveland
| 
| Monta Ellis (24)
| David Lee (14)
| Monta Ellis (7)
| Quicken Loans Arena19,919
| 28–35
|- bgcolor="#ffcccc"
| 64
| March 9
| @ New Jersey
| 
| David Lee (17)
| David Lee (10)
| Monta Ellis (4)
| Prudential Center13,513
| 28–36
|- bgcolor="#ccffcc"
| 65
| March 11
| Orlando
| 
| Monta Ellis (39)
| 3 players tied (6)
| Stephen Curry (12)
| Oracle Arena19,596
| 29–36
|- bgcolor="#ccffcc"
| 66
| March 13
| Minnesota
| 
| Stephen Curry (24)
| Stephen Curry (9)
| Stephen Curry (6)
| Oracle Arena17,788
| 30–36
|- bgcolor="#ffcccc"
| 67
| March 14
| @ Sacramento
| 
| Al Thornton (23)
| Lee, Radmanović (4)
| Monta Ellis (9)
| Power Balance Pavilion14,243
| 30–37
|- bgcolor="#ffcccc"
| 68
| March 16
| Dallas
| 
| Monta Ellis (26)
| David Lee (9)
| Monta Ellis (11)
| Oracle Arena19,596
| 30–38
|- bgcolor="#ffcccc"
| 69
| March 18
| @ Phoenix
| 
| Dorell Wright (30)
| David Lee (10)
| Stephen Curry (5)
| US Airways Center18,422
| 30–39
|- bgcolor="#ffcccc"
| 70
| March 20
| @ Dallas
| 
| Monta Ellis (18)
| David Lee (12)
| Stephen Curry (6)
| American Airlines Center20,324
| 30–40
|- bgcolor="#ffcccc"
| 71
| March 21
| @ San Antonio
| 
| Ekpe Udoh (15)
| David Lee (9)
| Monta Ellis (4)
| AT&T Center18,443
| 30–41
|- bgcolor="#ffcccc"
| 72
| March 23
| @ Houston
| 
| Dorell Wright (34)
| David Lee (9)
| Curry, Wright (6)
| Toyota Center16,623
| 30–42
|- bgcolor="#ccffcc"
| 73
| March 25
| Toronto
| 
| Monta Ellis (27)
| David Lee (7)
| Monta Ellis (10)
| Oracle Arena17,504
| 31–42
|- bgcolor="#ccffcc"
| 74
| March 27
| Washington
| 
| Monta Ellis (37)
| David Lee (12)
| Monta Ellis (13)
| Oracle Arena17,723
| 32–42
|- bgcolor="#ffcccc"
| 75
| March 29
| @ Oklahoma City
| 
| Stephen Curry (35)
| David Lee (15)
| Monta Ellis (11)
| Oklahoma City Arena18,203
| 32–43
|- bgcolor="#ffcccc"
| 76
| March 30
| @ Memphis
| 
| Ellis, Wright (16)
| David Lee (9)
| Stephen Curry (9)
| FedExForum13,815
| 32–44
|-

|- bgcolor="#ccffcc"
| 77
| April 2
| Dallas
| 
| Monta Ellis (32)
| Louis Amundson (10)
| Stephen Curry (8)
| Oracle Arena18,128
| 33–44
|- bgcolor="#ccffcc"
| 78
| April 5
| @ Portland
| 
| Monta Ellis (30)
| David Lee (20)
| Monta Ellis (5)
| Rose Garden20,551
| 34–44
|- bgcolor="#ccffcc"
| 79
| April 6
| L.A. Lakers
| 
| Monta Ellis (26)
| David Lee (17)
| Monta Ellis (6)
| Oracle Arena20,024
| 35–44
|- bgcolor="#ffcccc"
| 80
| April 10
| Sacramento
| 
| Stephen Curry (27)
| David Lee (14)
| Stephen Curry (8)
| Oracle Arena19,596
| 35–45
|- bgcolor="#ffcccc"
| 81
| April 11
| @ Denver
| 
| Curry, Wright (27)
| Louis Amundson (6)
| Curry, Lee (5)
| Pepsi Center19,155
| 35–46
|- bgcolor="#ccffcc"
| 82
| April 13
| Portland
| 
| Reggie Williams (28)
| Ekpe Udoh (8)
| Stephen Curry (9)
| Oracle Arena19,596
| 36–46
|-

Player statistics

Season

|- align="center" bgcolor=""
|  || 20 || 0 || 9.0 || .417 || .0 || .529 || 2.7 || 0.5 || .15 || .25 || 2.5
|- align="center" bgcolor="#f0f0f0"
|  || 40 || 7 || 14.2 || .446 || .0 || .299 || 3.9 || 0.4 || .33 || .65 || 4.0
|- align="center" bgcolor=""
|  || 19 || 0 || 9.0 || .279 || .286 || .500 || 0.9 || 0.7 || .32 || .05 || 1.7
|- align="center" bgcolor="#f0f0f0"
|  || 59 || 55 || 23.7 || .534 || .0 || .323 || 7.2 || 1.0 || .88 || .88 || 5.0
|- align="center" bgcolor=""
| * || 25 || 1 || 13.2 || .421 || .459 || .667 || 1.9 || 0.4 || .40 || .20 || 5.0
|- align="center" bgcolor="#f0f0f0"
|  || 68 || 68 || 33.5 || .475 || .436 || style="background:#FFCC33;color:#04529c;" | .932 || 3.7 || style="background:#FFCC33;color:#04529c;" | 5.8 || 1.50 || .28 || 18.3
|- align="center" bgcolor=""
|  || style="background:#FFCC33;color:#04529c;" | 76 || style="background:#FFCC33;color:#04529c;" | 76 || style="background:#FFCC33;color:#04529c;" | 40.4 || .450 || .355 || .783 || 3.6 || 5.7 || style="background:#FFCC33;color:#04529c;" | 2.14 || .28 || style="background:#FFCC33;color:#04529c;" | 24.1
|- align="center" bgcolor="#f0f0f0"
| * || 28 || 4 || 10.6 || .420 || .000 || .357 || 3.1 || 0.4 || .40 || .60 || 2.8
|- align="center" bgcolor=""
| * || 40 || 0 || 15.8 || .467 || .200 || .759 || 1.3 || 1.8 || .70 || .0 || 5.1
|- align="center" bgcolor="#f0f0f0"
|  || 67 || 67 || 35.7 || .502 || style="background:#FFCC33;color:#04529c;" | .500 || .781 || style="background:#FFCC33;color:#04529c;" | 9.6 || 3.2 || .96 || .40 || 16.3
|- align="center" bgcolor=""
|  || 24 || 0 || 9.0 || .382 || .000 || .667 || 0.9 || 1.1 || 1.13 || .38 || 2.2
|- align="center" bgcolor="#f0f0f0"
|  || 69 || 6 || 16.4 || .431 || .400 || .882 || 3.0 || 1.1 || .61 || .64 || 5.2
|- align="center" bgcolor=""
| * || 16 || 0 || 14.6 || .534 || .000 || .833 || 2.6 || 0.3 || .38 || .06 || 6.4
|- align="center" bgcolor="#f0f0f0"
|  || 52 || 12 || 17.1 || .446 || .0 || .685 || 3.0 || 0.6 || .33 || style="background:#FFCC33;color:#04529c;" | 1.37 || 4.1
|- align="center" bgcolor=""
|  || 74 || 7 || 20.3 || .472 || .424 || .746 || 2.7 || 1.5 || .36 || .04 || 9.3
|- align="center" bgcolor="#f0f0f0"
| * || 21 || 1 || 9.3 || style="background:#FFCC33;color:#04529c;" | .603 || .0 || .500 || 2.0 || 0.2 || .10 || .50 || 4.0
|- align="center" bgcolor=""
|  || style="background:#FFCC33;color:#04529c;" | 76 || style="background:#FFCC33;color:#04529c;" | 76 || 38.3 || .434 || .389 || .789 || 5.3 || 3.0 || 1.42 || .80 || 16.5
|}
As of March 31.
* – Stats with the Warriors.

Records and milestones

Season

Records
 NBA record: Most combined three-pointers in a game; Golden State Warriors franchise record: Most three-pointers in a game. The game between the Golden State Warriors and the Orlando Magic, a 123-120 overtime win by the Warriors, saw a combined 36 three-point shots made in an NBA game. The Warriors also set a franchise record by connecting 21 three-point shots.

Milestones
On April 6, 2011, Dorell Wright made a Warriors franchise record of 3 pt shots made in a season with 184 in a home win versus the Los Angeles Lakers, beating Jason Richardson with the previous record of 183 in the 2005–06 season.

On April 13, 2011, Wright became the first player in NBA history to have scored more points in his seventh season than all of his first six combined in a win against the Portland Trail Blazers. Wright also ended the season with the most 3-point shots made in the 2010–11 season with 194, as well as the most 3-point field goals attempted with 516, both of which set new Warriors franchise records.

Transactions

Trades

Free agency

Additions

Subtractions

Awards

References

Golden State Warriors seasons
Golden State Warriors
Golden
Golden